Karrar Jassim Mohammed Al-Mahmoudi (born 11 June 1987) known as Karrar Jassim, is an Iraqi professional footballer, who plays as a midfielder most recently for Naft Al-Wasat in the Iraqi Premier League. He also plays for the Iraq national football team.

Club career
Impressive displays for Najaf FC in the 2007 AFC Champions League, where he scored two goals in six matches, earned Karrar Jassim Mohammed a move to Qatar where he signed for Al Wakra at the start of June 2007. In 2009 Karrar signed for Iranian side Tractor S.C. for one season. During a Tractor match, Karrar was banned for 9 games following an incident in which he slapped the match assistant referee. The ban was later reduced to 5 and eventually to 3 games. He was released in May 2011 by Tractor for his disrespectful behavior toward referees. On 4 June 2011, Karrar joined the Tehran-based football team Esteghlal on a two-years contract. The 24-year-old striker has joined Esteghlal but he was fired in January 2012 during mid-season after a dispute with midfielder, and team vice-captain Mojtaba Jabbari. He then loaned to Shahin Bushehr and then moved to Ajman and a loan to Najaf FC.

On 4 July 2014, Karrar returned to Esteghlal with signing a two-year contract. Jassim left the club by mutual consent on 29 November 2015 after prolonged financial problems with the Iranian club.

International career
Karrar scored three goals for the Iraq Olympic team in the Asian Qualifiers for the 2008 Olympic Games, including winning goals against Thailand and DPR Korea. Karrar Jassim also scored a goal against Australia for the national team in the 2007 Asian Cup and also scored the winner against North Korea in the Asian Cup 2011 which sent Iraq through to the last eight.

Career statistics

Club statistics

 Assist Goals

International goals

Honours

Club
Shahin Bushehr
Hazfi Cup
Runner up (1): 2011–12
Al-Shorta
Iraqi Premier League:
Winner (1): 2018–19
Iraqi Super Cup:
Winner (1): 2019

Country
 Asian Games
 Silver medalist (1): 2006
 AFC Asian Cup
 Winner (1): 2007
 Arab Nations Cup
 Bronze medalist (1): 2012

References

External links

1987 births
Living people
Iraqi footballers
Iraq international footballers
2007 AFC Asian Cup players
2009 FIFA Confederations Cup players
2011 AFC Asian Cup players
AFC Asian Cup-winning players
Iraqi expatriate footballers
Esteghlal F.C. players
Ajman Club players
Tractor S.C. players
Expatriate footballers in Iran
Expatriate footballers in Qatar
Iraqi expatriate sportspeople in Iran
Iraqi expatriate sportspeople in Qatar
People from Najaf
Iraqi Shia Muslims
Al-Wakrah SC players
Al-Shorta SC players
Association football midfielders
Asian Games medalists in football
Footballers at the 2006 Asian Games
Qatar Stars League players
UAE Pro League players
Persian Gulf Pro League players
Asian Games silver medalists for Iraq
Medalists at the 2006 Asian Games